Andy Leon Mulumba Kabaluapa (born January 31, 1990) is a former Congolese-Canadian professional American football linebacker. He played college football for Eastern Michigan. He was drafted by the Winnipeg Blue Bombers second overall in the 2013 CFL Draft but subsequently signed with the Green Bay Packers as an undrafted free agent.

Professional career

Green Bay Packers
After going undrafted  in the 2013 NFL Draft, Mulumba signed with the Green Bay Packers as an undrafted free agent May 10, 2013. On September 17, Mulumba was diagnosed with a torn ACL.

Kansas City Chiefs
On April 1, 2016, Mulumba signed with the Kansas City Chiefs. On September 3, 2016, he was released by the Chiefs.

Oakland Raiders
On January 2, 2017, Mulumba signed a futures contract with the Raiders. He was waived on July 7, 2017.

Los Angeles Rams
On July 27, 2017, Mulumba signed with the Los Angeles Rams. He was waived on September 2, 2017.

Statistics
Source:

Regular season

Postseason

References

External links
 Green Bay Packers bio
 Eastern Michigan Eagles bio

1990 births
Living people
Democratic Republic of the Congo players of American football
Democratic Republic of the Congo players of Canadian football
Players of Canadian football from Quebec
Sportspeople from Montreal
Canadian football people from Montreal
Canadian football defensive linemen
American football linebackers
Eastern Michigan Eagles football players
Green Bay Packers players
Kansas City Chiefs players
Oakland Raiders players
Los Angeles Rams players
21st-century Democratic Republic of the Congo people